Colin Henry Turkington (born 21 March 1982) is a British racing driver from Northern Ireland who competes in the British Touring Car Championship for Team BMW. He is a 4 time BTCC champion, winning the title in 2009, 2014, 2018 and 2019, having made his debut in the series in 2002.

Career

Early career
Turkington, who was born in Portadown, began his racing career in the Ulster Karting series in 1993. He competed in autograss in 1996 and 1997, before moving on to the Northern Irish Metro Championship in 1998, where he won his first title. He moved on to the Ford Credit Fiesta Zetec Championship in Britain in 1999, winning the title in 2001.

British Touring Car Championship

Team Atomic Kitten (2002)
Turkington moved to the BTCC in 2002. His first BTCC drive was in a year-old MG ZS, sponsored by the pop group Atomic Kitten, partnering fellow Fiesta graduate Gareth Howell. He finished 14th in the Drivers' Championship.

West Surrey Racing (2003–04)

For 2003, Turkington moved to the manufacturer-backed West Surrey Racing, winning his first race at Brands Hatch and finishing 8th in the Drivers' Championship. Despite the loss of official MG backing in 2004, he finished 6th in the 2004 Drivers' Championship, taking the second win of his BTCC career at Mondello Park.

Vauxhall (2005)
For 2005, Turkington replaced champion James Thompson at Vauxhall. He finished 6th in the Drivers' Championship again, a performance which was not enough for him to retain the seat for the following season.

West Surrey Racing (2006–2009; 2013–2014)

For 2006, Turkington rejoined WSR to drive an RAC-backed MG ZS alongside Rob Collard. A strong first half of the season made him the closest challenger to Matt Neal for the title, although Jason Plato pipped him to 2nd in the Drivers' Championship in the final race of the year. Late in the season, the team switched to bio-ethanol fuel, almost becoming the first team to win a race with it. He finished 3rd in the 2006 Drivers' Championship, with two wins and 14 podium finishes.

For 2007, the BTC-spec MG was no longer eligible to win the championship outright, so the team switched to the BMW 320si. Turkington's first win of the season (and BMW's first in the BTCC for over a decade) came in the fourth weekend of the championship at Croft.  Turkington went on to win his first Independent Drivers' title, finishing 5th in the overall Drivers' Championship, with three wins.

Turkington competed with WSR in the Brands Hatch and Macau rounds of the World Touring Car Championship in 2007. At Brands Hatch, he finished 3rd in the first race on and then finished 4th in the second race, but as his car was not homologated because of its sequential gearbox, Turkington did not collect championship points. In Macau, he finished 13th and 8th in the two races.

In 2008, he was joined at WSR by Formula Three driver Stephen Jelley. Turkington won four races on his way to 5th in the Drivers' Championship, while also retaining his Independent Drivers' crown. He also finished every race that season in the top 10.

In 2009, Turkington took the championship lead at the mid-season point, and went on to win the BTCC title in a thrilling finale, after winning six races. Turkington finished consistently, with an unbroken run of eighteen point-scoring finishes, from Croft onwards, failing to finish in just one race. However WSR lost the title sponsor RAC and Turkington could not attempt to retain his title in 2010.

In 2013, Turkington returned to the BTCC with WSR (now competing as eBay Motors). He drove one of their three new BMW 125is. He finished 5th in the 2013 Drivers' Championship after taking five race wins.

Turkington stayed with the team for the 2014 season, taking eight race wins and eventually winning his second BTCC Drivers' title.

Team BMR (2015–2016)
After winning the championship with eBay Motors in 2014, Turkington switched to Team BMR for the 2015 season, driving alongside Jason Plato, Aron Smith and Warren Scott. In 2016, Team BMR announced a change of car to the Subaru Levorg, and after months of testing entered it into the 2016 season. The Subaru idea sprung up when Jason Plato and one of his engineers were talking back in 2012 about a works Subaru team. After a slow start at Brands Hatch and Donington Park where the team spent their time trying to develop the Subaru, Turkington scored a best finish of 10th at Donington Park. The team withdrew all four Subarus from the Thruxton round after an issue with the fuel line potentially causing fires.

The Levorg gained its first win in the BTCC at Oulton Park in Round 10. Turkington took a further 4 wins before the season ended and finished 4th in the drivers championship standings.

West Surrey Racing (2017–present)

For 2017, Turkington once again re-joined the outfit headed by Dick Bennetts; the source of his previous two championship victories. He joined Andrew Jordan and Rob Collard in a trio of BMW 125i M Sports - the car was a development from when Turkington won the 2014 championship.

Turkington collided with Matt Neal off the startline at the season opener at Brands Hatch, but salvaged a 9th-place finish in Race 2 from the back of the grid after a last-gasp move on Michael Epps. He finished second in Race 3 behind teammate Andrew Jordan. During the year, the Ulsterman took 4 race wins, including the 100th BTCC win for BMW at Thruxton. He went into the final round battling for the championship with Ashley Sutton, his replacement at Team BMR. Despite the title fight going down to the final race, his hopes ended when he collided with Mat Jackson early in the race, meaning he finished the year as runner-up.

World Touring Car Championship

In 2010, Turkington competed in three rounds of the 2010 World Touring Car Championship series (WTCC) driving a BMW for WSR at Algarve, Brands Hatch and Brno. At Brands Hatch, he was the top BMW on the grid in 4th, eventually finishing 3rd in race one and 5th in race two, comfortably winning the Independents' class in both races. With additional points awarded to an Independent driver finishing in the top ten positions overall, Turkington moved into second place in the Independents' championship, despite having only competed in two meetings at that point. On 1 August 2010, the WTCC altered their regulations which effectively stopped Turkington being classed as an Independent.

In October 2010, it was announced that Turkington and WSR would compete in the final two rounds of the WTCC in Japan and Macau. He took his first WTCC win in Japan after Augusto Farfus and Andy Priaulx were disqualified.

In July 2011, Turkington competed in three more WTCC rounds for Wiechers-Sport.

On 26 October 2012, Turkington announced that he would again be racing in the WTCC at China for the WSR-run Team Aviva-Cofco. Turkington drove the spare RML Group Chevrolet Cruze 1.6t. He qualified 5th on the grid, but first-lap incidents in both races meant he had to recover from near the back of the field twice. His efforts were rewarded with two points finishes.

Scandinavian Touring Car Championship
For 2011, Turkington drove a BMW 320si in the Scandinavian Touring Car Championship for Flash Engineering, as teammate of Jan Nilsson. Turkington scored five podium finishes in 18 races but no wins, and finished 5th in the Drivers' Championship.

Other work
Turkington was elected to the MSA's Race Elite Scheme in April 2007, along with five other drivers in various British series. He has also done TV work, presenting a BBC Northern Ireland report on environmental damage in 2002.

Racing record

Complete British Touring Car Championship results
(key) Races in bold indicate pole position (1 point awarded – 2002–2003 all races, 2004–present just in first race) Races in italics indicate fastest lap (1 point awarded all races) * signifies that driver lead race for at least one lap (1 point awarded – 2002 just in feature races, 2003–present all races)

Complete World Touring Car Championship results
(key) (Races in bold indicate pole position) (Races in italics indicate fastest lap)

† Not eligible for points.

Complete Scandinavian Touring Car Championship results
(key) (Races in bold indicate pole position) (Races in italics indicate fastest lap)

Complete International Superstars Series results
(key) (Races in bold indicate pole position) (Races in italics indicate fastest lap)

24 Hours of Silverstone results

Notes

References

External links

 
 
 Team website

1982 births
Living people
People from Portadown
People educated at Portadown College
Racing drivers from Northern Ireland
British Touring Car Championship drivers
British Touring Car Championship Champions
World Touring Car Championship drivers
Superstars Series drivers
Britcar 24-hour drivers
BMW M drivers